is the 8th and final single by the Hello! Project girl group Tanpopo, and the first and only release by the group's "third generation" (Rika Ishikawa, Ayumi Shibata, Asami Konno, and Risa Niigaki). It was released on September 26, 2002 with the catalog number EPCE-5178. The first pressing came with a special trading card. The single peaked at #5 on the weekly Oricon charts, charting for 6 weeks. The single has a "crisp feel", with a touch of hip hop and R&B.

This single sold 40,070 copies in its first week and 60,450 copies all together, making it the group's lowest-selling single. It was not, however, their worst-charting single, as it cracked Oricon's top five, which some "first generation" singles had failed to do. The PV for the song was featured on Tanpopo Single V Clips 1, released in June 2004.

Track listing

References

External links 
  entry on the Hello! Project official website

Members at time of single
 Rika Ishikawa
 Ayumi Shibata
 Risa Niigaki
 Asami Konno

2002 songs
Tanpopo songs
Song recordings produced by Tsunku
Japanese-language songs
Songs written by Tsunku